The Malpelo Plate is a small tectonic plate (microplate) located off the coasts west of Ecuador and Colombia. It is the 57th plate to be identified. It is named after Malpelo Island, the only emerged part of the plate. It is bounded on the west by the Cocos Plate, on the south by the Nazca Plate, on the east by the North Andes Plate, and on the north by the Coiba Plate, separated by the Coiba Transform Fault (CTF). This microplate was previously assumed to be part of the Nazca Plate. The Malpelo Plate borders three major faults of Pacific Colombia, the north to south striking Bahía Solano Fault in the north and the Naya-Micay and Remolino-El Charco Faults in the south.

Description 
The Malpelo Plate was hypothesised in 2013  and identified by a non-closure of the Nazca-Cocos-Pacific plate motion circuit, in a paper published in 2017. The formation of the oceanic crust of the plate has been estimated to be since the Middle Miocene (14.7 Ma).

The researchers used a Columbia University database of multibeam sonar soundings west of Ecuador and Colombia to identify a diffuse plate boundary that runs from the Panama Transform Fault (PTF) eastward to where the boundary intersects a deep oceanic trench just offshore of the South American coast, north of the Galapagos Islands.

Gallery

References

Bibliography

Further reading

External links 
 Map of the Malpelo Plate

Tectonic plates
Geology of Colombia
Geology of Ecuador
Geology of the Pacific Ocean
Geography of Chocó Department
Geography of Valle del Cauca Department
Geography of Nariño Department
Geography of Esmeraldas Province
Geography of Manabí Province